The Tapenagá River (Spanish, Río Tapenagá) is a river of Chaco Province and Santa Fe Province, Argentina. It is a tributary of the Paraná Miní River.

See also
List of rivers of Argentina

References

 Rand McNally, The New International Atlas, 1993.

Rivers of Argentina
Rivers of Santa Fe Province
Rivers of Chaco Province
Tributaries of the Paraná River